Wound of a Little Horse is the debut EP by the Australian alternative rock and post-punk band Witch Hats, released through In-Fidelity Recordings on 13 November 2006.

The album was produced by Ben Ling and Phill Calvert of The Birthday Party. The artwork pays a loose homage to the banned "Butcher" cover by The Beatles, and was photographed in an abandoned orphanage in St Kilda.

Track listing

References

2006 debut EPs
Witch Hats EPs